Gusttavo Lima e você or E você is the third album of Brazilian sertanejo singer Gusttavo Lima and his second live album after Inventor dos amores. It was released in Brazil in 2011 and in Europe and North America in 2012. The songs were recorded during a live concert on 3 June 2011 and in front of an audience of 60,000 during the festival "Festa Nacional do Milho". at the Exhibition Park of the Brazilian city Patos de Minas, Lima's hometown in Minas Gerais state, Brazil. The live materials were also released in DVD form. The whole album has sold over 100,000 copies in Brazil.

The show lasted three hours during which Lima performed 29 songs, out of which 23 were included in the album. Besides his known songs, he sang 11 new songs never before released.

Track listing

Charts and certifications

Peak positions

Certifications

References

2011 live albums
Portuguese-language live albums